Guests Wanted is a 1932 American Pre-Code short subject directed by Ralph Ceder.

Cast
Benny Rubin as Benny
Nell Breen as Nell
Louise Carver as Mrs. Carver
Charles Dorety as Second Miner
Billy Franey as First Miner
Bud Jamison as Jimmy

External links

1932 films
1932 comedy films
RKO Pictures short films
American black-and-white films
Films directed by Ralph Ceder
American comedy short films
1930s English-language films
1930s American films